Roger Lee Brown (May 1, 1937 – September 17, 2021) was an American professional football player who was a defensive tackle in the National Football League (NFL). He played college football at Maryland State College before playing professionally for the Detroit Lions (1960–1966) and Los Angeles Rams (1967–1969).

Football career

Brown was drafted in the fourth round, 42nd overall, in the 1960 NFL Draft out of Maryland State College by the Detroit Lions. Played in the College All-Star Game in Chicago vs the Baltimore Colts. He played with the original fearsome foursome, with Alex Karras, Sam Williams and Darris McCord, He was named the 1962 Outstanding Defensive Lineman in the league, and sacked both Bart Starr and Johnny Unitas for safeties. Tying an individual NFL record for safeties scored in a single season; first set in 1932.   He played for the Lions through the 1966 season, then was traded to the Los Angeles Rams.  He was known for his performance in the "Thanksgiving Day Massacre" game against the Green Bay Packers in 1962 where he sacked Bart Starr seven times, including one for a safety.

During his stint with the Rams, Brown, along with Deacon Jones, Lamar Lundy, and Merlin Olsen formed the "Fearsome Foursome", the most feared defensive line at the time. He retired after three seasons with the Rams, ending a career in which he was an NFL Pro Bowl player for 6 straight seasons (1962–1967) and a 2-time first-team All-Pro (1962 and 1963). Brown was one of the first NFL players to have a playing weight over 300 lb but his size and speed made him one of the most dynamic players of the time.

In 1997, Brown was inducted into the Virginia Sports Hall of Fame. The Professional Football Researchers Association named Brown to the PRFA Hall of Very Good Class of 2007. In 2009 Brown was inducted into the College Football Hall of Fame.

On Sunday, October 28, 2018, Brown was inducted into the Pride of the Lions at Ford Field during halftime of the game vs. the Seattle Seahawks.

In 2019, he was selected at No. 19 on the Detroit Free Press ranking of the Detroit Lions' top 100 all-time players.

Restaurateur

After his playing career was over, Brown went into the restaurant business. He started a chain of eight restaurants in the Chicago area, and later owned three McDonald's locations in Virginia. He owned Roger Brown's Restaurant and Sports Bar in Portsmouth, Virginia, and the Cove Taverns in Williamsburg, and Newport News, Virginia,  was active in the Hampton Roads community, serving on 14 various local boards and committees.

Notes

1937 births
2021 deaths
American football defensive linemen
Los Angeles Rams players
Detroit Lions players
Western Conference Pro Bowl players
Maryland Eastern Shore Hawks football players
College Football Hall of Fame inductees
People from Surry County, Virginia
Players of American football from Virginia